Airport is a 1970 American air disaster–drama film written and directed by George Seaton and starring Burt Lancaster and Dean Martin. Based on Arthur Hailey's 1968 novel of the same name, it originated the 1970s disaster film genre. It is also the first of four films in the Airport film series. Produced on a $10 million budget, it earned over $128 million.

The film is about an airport manager trying to keep his airport open during a snowstorm, while a suicide bomber plots to blow up a Boeing 707 airliner in flight. It takes place at fictional Lincoln International Airport near Chicago. The film was a commercial success and surpassed Spartacus as Universal Pictures' biggest moneymaker. The movie won Helen Hayes an Academy Award for Best Supporting Actress for her role as an elderly stowaway and was nominated for nine other Academy Awards, including Best Picture, Best Cinematography, and Best Costume Design for designer Edith Head.

With attention paid to the detail of day-to-day airport and airline operations, the plot concerns the response to a paralyzing snowstorm, environmental concerns over noise pollution, and an attempt to blow up an airliner. The film is characterized by personal stories intertwining while decisions are made minute-by-minute by the airport and airline staffs, operations and maintenance crews, flight crews, and Federal Aviation Administration air traffic controllers.

Ernest Laszlo photographed it in 70 mm Todd-AO. It is the last film scored by Alfred Newman and the last film roles of Van Heflin and Jessie Royce Landis. It was also Ross Hunter's last film produced for Universal after a 17-year tenure.

Plot
The Chicago area is paralyzed by a snowstorm affecting Lincoln International Airport. A Trans Global Airlines (TGA) Boeing 707 flight crew misjudge their turn from Runway 29 onto the taxiway, becoming stuck in the snow and closing that runway. Airport manager Mel Bakersfeld is forced to work overtime, causing tension with his wife, Cindy. A divorce seems imminent as he nurtures a closer relationship with a co-worker, TGA customer relations agent Tanya Livingston.

Vernon Demerest is a TGA captain scheduled to be the checkride captain for the airline to evaluate Captain Anson Harris during TGA Flight 2 to Rome. TGA's flagship international service, named The Golden Argosy, is being operated with a Boeing 707. Although Demerest is married to Bakersfeld's sister, Sarah, he is secretly having an affair with Gwen Meighen, chief stewardess on the flight, who informs him before takeoff that she is pregnant with his child.

Bakersfeld borrows TWA mechanic Joe Patroni to assist with moving TGA's disabled plane blocking Runway 29. Bakersfeld and Tanya also deal with Ada Quonsett, an elderly widow from San Diego who is a habitual stowaway on various airlines.

Demolition expert D.O. Guerrero, down on his luck and with a history of mental illness, buys both a one-way TGA ticket aboard TGA Flight 2 and a large life insurance policy with the intent of committing suicide by blowing up the plane. He plans to set off a bomb in an attaché case while over the Atlantic Ocean so that his wife, Inez, will collect the insurance money of $225,000 ($ in ). His erratic behavior at the airport, including using his last cash to buy the insurance policy and mistaking a U.S. Customs officer for an airline gate agent, attracts airport officials' attention. Inez finds a Special Delivery envelope from a travel agency and, realizing D.O. might be doing something desperate, goes to the airport to try to dissuade him. She informs airport officials that he had been fired from a construction job for "misplacing" explosives and that the family's financial situation is dire.

Ada Quonsett manages to evade the TGA employee assigned the task of putting her on a flight back to Los Angeles. Enchanted by the idea of a trip to Rome, she talks her way past the gate agent, boards Flight 2, and happens to sit next to Guerrero. When Flight 2's crew is made aware of Guerrero's presence and possible intentions, they turn the plane back toward Chicago without informing the passengers. Once Ada is discovered, her help is enlisted by the crew to get to Guerrero's briefcase, but the ploy fails when a troublesome passenger interferes and returns the case to Guerrero.

Demerest goes back into the passenger cabin and tries to persuade Guerrero not to trigger the bomb, informing him that his insurance policy has been nullified. Guerrero briefly moves to give Demerest the bomb, but just then another passenger exits the lavatory at the rear of the aircraft, and the same troublesome passenger yells out that Guerrero has a bomb. Guerrero runs into the lavatory and sets off the bomb, dying instantly and blowing a three-foot hole in the fuselage. Gwen, just outside the door, is injured in the explosion and subsequent explosive decompression, but the pilots retain control of the airplane.

With all airports east of Chicago unusable due to bad weather, Flight 2 returns to Lincoln for an emergency landing. Due to the bomb damage, Demerest demands the airport's longest runway, Runway 29, which is still closed due to the stuck airliner. Bakersfeld orders the plane to be pushed off the runway by snowplows, despite the costly damage they would do to it. Patroni, who is "taxi-qualified" on 707s, has been trying to move the stuck aircraft in time for Demerest's damaged aircraft to land. By exceeding the 707's engine operating parameters, Patroni frees the stuck jet without damage, allowing Runway 29 to be reopened just in time for the crippled TGA Flight 2 to land.

As the shaken passengers exit the plane, a hysterical Inez searches in vain for her dead husband. Demerest's wife sees him accompanying Gwen's stretcher as he says he'll go with her to the hospital. Bakersfield and Tanya leave together, heading to her apartment for much needed rest and breakfast.

In a brief epilogue, Ada is enjoying her reward of free first-class travel on TGA. But as she arrives at the gate, she laments that it was "much more fun the other way."

Cast

Production notes
Most of the filming was at Minneapolis–Saint Paul International Airport. A display in the terminal, with stills from the field and the film, says: "Minnesota's legendary winters attracted Hollywood here in 1969, when portions of the film Airport were shot in the terminal and on the field. The weather remained stubbornly clear, however, forcing the director to use plastic 'snow' to create the appropriate effect."

The set built representing the interior of the 707 was left standing at Universal Studios and was eventually joined with the 747 interior set constructed for Airport 1975 on "Stage 747." Both sets were used extensively in other Universal films and television series. The 707 set was used, for instance, in The Andromeda Strain and on series like Ironside. The sets were removed around 2002 and the space converted into a workshop.

Only one Boeing 707 was used: a model 707-349C (registration ) leased from Flying Tiger Line. It sported an El Al cheatline over its bare metal finish, with the fictional Trans Global Airlines (TGA) titles and tail. This aircraft later crashed on March 21, 1989 during approach into São Paulo while in service as cargo flight Transbrasil Flight 801, killing all three crew members and 22 persons on the ground.

Release
Airport was released on May 29, 1970. It premiered as the first 70mm film to be shown at New York's Radio City Music Hall, running for 12 weeks there as its Easter attraction.

Reception

Box office
Internationally, it grossed $27.9 million for a worldwide gross of $128.4 million.

Critical response
Variety wrote: "Based on the novel by Arthur Hailey, over-produced by Ross Hunter with a cast of stars as long as a jet runway, and adapted and directed by George Seaton in a glossy, slick style, Airport is a handsome, often dramatically involving $10 million epitaph to a bygone brand of filmmaking" but added that the film "does not create suspense because the audience knows how it's going to end." Film critic Pauline Kael gave Airport one of its worst contemporary reviews, scornfully dismissing it as "bland entertainment of the old school." "There's no electricity in it", she wrote; "every stereotyped action is followed by a stereotyped reaction." Roger Ebert gave the film two stars out of four and faulted a predictable plot and characters that "talk in regulation B-movie clichés like no B-movie you've seen in ten years." Gene Siskel gave the film two-and-a-half stars out of four and reported that while the theater audience cheered at the climax, "it's a long and torturous road to the applause. Blocking the path are speeches that promote the industry, dialog that ranks among the silliest in memory, and a labored plot that tells you everything twice. Vincent Canby of The New York Times called it "an immensely silly film—and it will probably entertain people who no longer care very much about movies." Charles Champlin of the Los Angeles Times called the film "breath-taking in its celebration of anything which used to work when Hollywood was younger and we were all more innocent." Gary Arnold of The Washington Post called it "a lousy movie" that was "utterly predictable." The Monthly Film Bulletin wrote, "Corny is really the only word for this unbelievably old-fashioned look at the modern phenomenon of an international airport: the one surprise is that the sweet old white-haired stowaway doesn't spring to the controls and bring the distressed aircraft down single-handed as Doris Day did once upon a time in analogous circumstances."

Christopher Null wrote in 2000, "With one grandiose entrance, Airport ushered in a genre of moviemaking that is still going strong—the disaster movie... Too bad the 'disaster' doesn't happen until 2 hours into the 2:15 movie. No matter—Airport'''s unending sequels and spoofs are a testament that this film is a true piece of Americana, for good or for bad." Despite the film being one of the most profitable of Burt Lancaster's career, he called it "a piece of junk."

Review aggregator Rotten Tomatoes gives the film a rating of 75%, based on 16 reviews, with an average rating of 6.3/10.  On Metacritic, the film holds an average rating of 42/100, based on 5 critics, indicating "mixed or average reviews".

Awards and nominations

Television
The film was first broadcast on Canada's CTV on October 24, 1973, nearly a month before ABC on November 11. The ABC broadcast became the joint highest-rated film on television, matching Love Story, with a Nielsen rating of 42.3 but with a slightly higher audience share of 63% (compared to Love Story's 62%). The record was beaten in 1976 by Gone with the Wind.

Score
The film was the final project for composer Alfred Newman. His health was failing and he was unable to conduct the sessions for his music's recording. The job was handled by Stanley Wilson, although the covers of the Decca "original soundtrack album" and the 1993 Varèse Sarabande CD issue credit Newman. Newman did conduct the music heard in the film. He died before the film's release. Newman received his 45th Academy Award nomination posthumously for this film, the most received by a composer at that time.

Soundtrack
 From the soundtrack, the instrumental, "Airport Love Theme" by Vincent Bell peaked at number thirty-one on the Billboard Hot 100 chart and number two for three weeks on the Billboard Adult contemporary chart.

Track listing
 Airport (Main Title) (3:11)
 Airport Love Theme (3:30)
 Inez' Theme (1:29)
 Guerrero's Goodbye (2:37)
 Ada Quonsett, Stowaway (1:26)
 Mel And Tanya (2:27)
 Airport Love Theme #2 (2:40)
 Joe Patroni Plane Or Plows? (2:22)
 Triangle! (3:50)
 Inez-Lost Forever (1:45)
 Emergency Landing! (1:38)
 Airport (End Title) (2:36)

Personnel
Bud Shank - reeds
Carol Kaye - electric bass
Bill Plummer - double bass
Dennis Budimir, Howard Roberts, Joe Cinderella, Tommy Tedesco - guitar

SequelsAirport had three sequels, the first two of which were hits.
 Airport 1975 Airport '77 The Concorde ... Airport '79 (titled Airport '80: The Concorde in the United Kingdom & Japan)

The only actor to appear in all four films is George Kennedy as Joe Patroni. Patroni's character evolves and he goes from a chief mechanic in Airport to a vice president of operations in Airport 1975, a consultant in Airport '77, and an experienced pilot in The Concorde ... Airport '79.

See also

 The High and the Mighty, a 1954 film which served as the template for Airport Zero Hour!, a 1957 film written by Arthur Hailey that visited the airline disaster film genre a decade before Hailey published Airport Jet Storm, a 1959 British film with many similarities
 Airplane! (1980), a successful parody film that blended elements of an already well-established airline disaster film genre, including plot points inspired by Airport '75 as well as Zero Hour! Starflight: The Plane That Couldn't Land, a 1983 ABC television movie, starring Lee Majors. Also known as Starflight One or Airport 85.

References

External links

 
 
 
 
 
 [https://archive.today/20130221044758/http://www.airliners.net/search/photo.search?cnsearch=19354/503&distinct_entry=true Airliners.net Photos of the aircraft used in the film'']

1970 films
1970s thriller drama films
1970s disaster films
1970s American films
Airport (film series)
American aviation films
American disaster films
1970s English-language films
Films about aviation accidents or incidents
Films based on thriller novels
Films directed by George Seaton
Films featuring a Best Supporting Actress Academy Award-winning performance
Films featuring a Best Supporting Actress Golden Globe-winning performance
Films produced by Ross Hunter
Films scored by Alfred Newman
Films set in Chicago
Films set in airports
Films set on airplanes
Films shot in Minnesota
Universal Pictures films
Films based on works by Arthur Hailey
Minneapolis–Saint Paul International Airport
1970 drama films